Maximiano de Sousa (20 January 1918, in Funchal, Madeira – 29 May 1980) was a Portuguese Fado singer. Max was one of the most popular Fado singers from the 1940s until well after his death in 1980.

Personal life

Maximiano de Sousa, known to most people as Max, was a Madeiran (Portuguese: madeirense), born in Funchal in 1918. It was here where his career started. He was a tailor, and even after becoming an artist, he long maintained that profession. In 1936 he began working at night in a hotel bar in Funchal as a singer and continued to work as a tailor during the day. In 1957, he left for the United States where he remained for two years, afterward he toured Angola, Mozambique, South Africa, Brazil, and Argentina.

Selected discography
(incomplete)
Noites da Madeira/Bailinho da Madeira (78, VC, 1949)
Bailinho da Madeira/Noites da Madeira (Single, Decca/VC, 1956)
A Mula da Cooperativa / A Coisa / O Magala / O Homem do Trombone (Columbia)
Porto Santo
31
Sinal da Cruz
Pomba Branca, Pomba Branca/Quando a Dor Bateu à Porta (Single, Decca/VC, 1974)
As Bordadeira
Casei com uma Velha
Júlia Florista
Maria Rapaz
Maria tu tens a mania
Mas sou fadista
Mula da Cooperativa
Nem ás paredes confesso
Noite
O Magala
Pomba Branca
Porto Santo
Rosinha dos Limões
Saudades da Ilha
Sinal da Cruz
Vielas de Alfama

References

Portuguese fado singers
20th-century Portuguese male singers
1980 deaths
1918 births
People from Funchal